Word heaping is a technique used for text justification in Arabic script, in which one word can be placed over another to save space on the line.

Heap ligatures in Unicode
Arabic Presentation Forms-A has a few characters defined as "word ligatures" for terms frequently used in formulaic expressions in Arabic. A few example ligatures that feature heaping are shown below:

References

Notes

See also 
 Word wrap
 Kashida

Arabic calligraphy
Typography